The Argentina women's national rugby sevens team has been the second most successful team in South America after Brazil. At the CONSUR Women's Sevens, Argentina has been runner-up three times.

History 
They have won the 2012, 2013 and 2015 Seven de la República. Argentina participated in the 2015 Hong Kong Women's Sevens, becoming the 38th nation to compete in Hong Kong since 1997. They were pooled with Canada, Samoa and Mexico.

The team qualified to the 2016 Final Olympic Qualification Tournament. They were knocked out of the Cup quarter-finals by Russia. Argentina competed at the 2019 Sudamérica Olympic Qualifying Tournament in Peru, finishing in third place and qualifying for the Repechage tournament in Monaco.

Argentina announced ahead of the 2021 Sudamérica Women's Sevens that their new nickname was Las Yaguaretés.

Players

Previous squads 

 Gisela Acuna
 Gimena Acuna
 Lettizia Alcaraz
 Noelia Billerbeck
 Eugenia Botelli
 Rita Cazorla
 Isabel Fontanarrosa
 Viviana Garat
 Vanesa Garnelo
 Carolina Ohaco
 Vanesa Salas
 Xoana Sosa

Tournament history

2013 USA Sevens
POOL B
  27–0 
  31–0 
  41–0 

SF Bowl
  27–0 

11th/12th Place Playoff
  5–25

References

External links
 

Women's national rugby sevens teams
R
Rugby union in Argentina